Lucienne Le Marchand (15 November 1908 – 9 February 1992) was a Belgian stage, film and television actress.

Selected filmography
 Song of Farewell (1934)
 Crime and Punishment (1935)
 The Mysteries of Paris (1935)
 Yoshiwara (1937)
 Tobias Is an Angel (1940)
 Fantômas (1946)
Judicial Error (1948)
 The Unexpected Voyager (1950)
 The Case of Doctor Galloy (1951)
 The Red Head (1952)
 The Drunkard (1953)
Mr Klein with alain Delon (1976)

References

Bibliography
 Goble, Alan. The Complete Index to Literary Sources in Film. Walter de Gruyter, 1999.

External links

1908 births
1992 deaths
Belgian film actresses
Belgian stage actresses
Belgian television actresses
Actresses from Brussels